The S&P Latin America 40 is a stock market index from Standard & Poor's. It tracks Latin American stocks.

The S&P Latin America 40 is one of seven headline indices making up S&P Global 1200 and includes highly liquid securities from    economic sectors of Mexican and South American equity markets. Companies from Brazil, Chile, Colombia, Mexico and Peru are represented in this index. Representing approximately 70% of each country's market capitalization, this index provides coverage of the large cap, liquid constituents of each key country in Latin America.

The S&P Latin America 40 is maintained by the S&P Index Committee, whose members include Standard and Poor's economists and index analysts. The goal of the Index Committee is to ensure that the S&P Latin America 40 remains an accurate measure of Latin American markets, reflecting the risk and return characteristics of the broader universe on an ongoing basis. As of 2010, S&P Latin America 40 consisted of forty companies with a market capitalization of US$450.07 billion.

There is an ETF tracking this index.

Constituent companies
, the constituent stocks of the S&P Latin America 40 are:

Country coverage

, the country coverage is the following:

See also
Economy of Brazil - B3
Economy of Chile -  Santiago Stock Exchange
Economy of Mexico - Mexican Stock Exchange
Economy of Peru - Lima Stock Exchange
Economy of Colombia - Colombia Stock Exchange

References

External links
 S&P page

South American stock market indices
S&P Dow Jones Indices